Negastrn is a settlement north of Moravče in central Slovenia. The area is part of the traditional region of Upper Carniola. It is now included with the rest of the Municipality of Moravče in the Central Slovenia Statistical Region. The settlement includes the hamlets of Spodnja Vas, Zgornja Vas, and Podoreh.

Name
Negastrn was attested in historical sources in 1348 as Nogostrinne, in 1363 as Negoztrm, in 1367 as Negostrin, in 1370 as Negroscrim, in 1425 as Negosdrin, and in 1489 as Negnastrin. It is hypothesized that the name is derived from *Něgostryjьnъ (vьrhъ) 'Něgostryjь's (peak)', referring to an early person associated with the place and its elevated location.

References

External links

Negastrn on Geopedia

Populated places in the Municipality of Moravče